Marina Willer is a graphic designer and filmmaker.

Biography 

Willer studied graphic design at the Royal College of Art. Before joining Pentagram as a partner in 2012, she was head creative director for Wolff Olins in London.

During the course of her career, Willer has led the design of major identities schemes for Amnesty International, Tate, Southbank Centre, Serpentine Galleries, Nesta, Oxfam, Macmillan Cancer Support and Rogers Stirk Harbour + Partners among many others. She led the rebrand of Battersea and has designed exhibitions for the Design Museum and the Barbican Centre.

Willer's first feature film, Red Trees, premiered at the 2017 Cannes Film Festival and was released worldwide by Netflix in 2018. Willer has made several films for British architect Richard Rogers, including Exposed – a film to introduce Rogers' exhibition at the Pompidou Centre – and Ethos, which was screened at the Royal Academy of Arts.

She has been a D&AD judge, an external examiner at the Royal College of Art and is a member of the Alliance Graphique Internationale. She was named one of Creative Review's Creative Leaders 2017 and was inducted into Design Week's Hall of Fame in 2018. 

In 2021 Marina was made a Royal Designer for Industry (RDI) by the Royal Society of Arts in London.

References

External links

Living people
Alumni of the Royal College of Art
Film directors from London
People from Curitiba
Brazilian emigrants to the United Kingdom
Women graphic designers
Creative directors
Year of birth missing (living people)
Pentagram partners (past and present)